Kotwica Kołobrzeg, for sponsorships reasons Energa Kotwica Kołobrzeg, is a Polish basketball team, based in Kołobrzeg.

In the 2004–05 season, Kotwica promoted to the domestic first tier Polish Basketball League (PLK). Their home arena is Hala Millennium. In 2009, the team won the Polish Cup, its first championship. In 2014, the club was declared bankrupt. Consequently, a new club was found which started in the II Liga, the domestic third tier.

Sponsorship names
Due to sponsorship reasons, the team has been known as:
Energa Kotwica Kołobrzeg (2017–present)

Honours
Polish Cup
Winners (1): 2008–09

Notable players
Oded Brandwein (born 1988), Israeli-Polish basketball player for  Maccabi Tel Aviv of the Euroleague and the Israeli Basketball Premier League

References

External links
Official Facebook page

Kotwica Kołobrzeg
Basketball teams in Poland
Kołobrzeg
Sport in West Pomeranian Voivodeship